KPSD may refer to:

 KPSD-FM, a radio station (97.1 FM) licensed to Faith, South Dakota, United States
 KPSD-TV, a television station (channel 25) licensed to Eagle Butte, South Dakota, United States
KRLD-FM, a radio station that held the call letters KPSD from ? to ? licensed to Dallas, Texas, United States
 Knots per square decimeter